Following the 2010 United Kingdom general election, the UK Government under the Cameron–Clegg coalition
announced plans to curb public spending through the abolition of a large number of quasi-autonomous non-governmental organisations (quangos).  This was styled in the national press as a "bonfire of the quangos", making reference to Girolamo Savonarola's religiously inspired Bonfire of the Vanities ("falò delle vanità"). 

On 23 May 2010, Chancellor of the Exchequer George Osborne unveiled a £500 million plan to reduce the budget deficit by abolishing or merging many quangos. The cuts and closures received criticism in some quarters, but was generally welcomed by the business community. A decade later in 2021, the UK Parliament’s Public Accounts Committee claimed in a report that  the reforms “failed to spark” and that the Cabinet Office has “not been enforcing the code for public appointments”.

Categorisation of reform
On 14 October 2010, the government released a document Public Bodies Reform – Proposals for Change outlining plans for each quango. The document broadly classified each quango into one of four groups:

Retain  the government thought it expedient to retain the organisation
 Merge  the organisation would be merged with another organ of state or its function could be replicated by a third sector organisation
 Abolish  the organisation would be abolished
Under consideration  firm plans were not drawn up for organisations in this category, but deadlines were set for complete consideration.
The document also contained a description of which ministry of state or government department the organisation was part of.

Quangos to be abolished
The Department for Business, Innovation and Skills
 Aircraft and Shipbuilding Industries Arbitration Tribunal 
 British Shipbuilders
 Union Modernisation Fund Supervisory Board

The Cabinet Office
 Office for Civil Society Advisory Body
 Communities and Local Government
 Advisory Panel for the Local Innovation Awards Scheme

The Department for Communities and Local Government
 National Housing and Planning Advice Unit 
 National Tenant Voice
 Standards Board for England

The Department for Culture, Media and Sport
 Advisory Council on Libraries
 Legal Deposit Advisory Panel

The Department of Energy and Climate Change
 Advisory Committee on Carbon Abatement Technologies
 Renewables Advisory Board

The Department for Environment, Food and Rural Affairs
 Advisory Committee on Organic Standards
 Agricultural Dwelling House Advisory Committees
 Agricultural Wages Board for England and Wales 
 Agricultural Wages Committees
 Animal Health and Welfare Strategy England Implementation Group
 Committee on Agricultural Valuation 
 Commons Commissioners 
 Expert Panel on Air Quality Standards 
 Food from Britain 
 Inland Waterways Advisory Council
 Royal Commission on Environmental Pollution

The Department for Education
 Teachers TV Board of Governors

The Foreign and Commonwealth Office
 Caribbean Board

The Ministry of Justice
 Administrative Justice and Tribunals Council 
 Courts boards
 Legal Services Ombudsman 
 Public Guardian Board 
 Victim’s Advisory Panel
 Youth Justice Board for England and Wales
 Animal Welfare Advisory Committee

The Department for Transport
 Railway Heritage Committee

Quangos to be abolished with reservations
Some or all functions of these quangos was to be transferred to civil service, local government, other quangos, expert committees, charity or the private sector.

The Department for Business, Innovation and Skills
 British Nuclear Fuels Limited
 Competition Service
 Copyright Tribunal
 Design Council
 Hearing Aid Council
 NESTA
 Regional development agencies 
 BIS SITPRO Limited
 Strategic Advisory Board for Intellectual Property
 Waste Electrical and Electronic Equipment Advisory Body

The Cabinet Office
 Civil Service Appeal Board
 Commission for the Compact
 Government Strategic Marketing Advisory Board
 Main Honours Advisory Committee
 Security Commission

The Department for Communities and Local Government
 Advisory Panel on Standards for the Planning Inspectorate
 Audit Commission for Local Authorities and the National Health Service in England
 Community Development Foundation
 Firebuy
 Infrastructure Planning Commission
 London Thames Gateway Development Corporation
 Olympic Park Legacy Company Limited
 Rent Assessment Panels / Residential Property Tribunal Service
 The Office for Tenants and Social Landlords
 Thurrock Development Corporation 
 Valuation Tribunal for England
 Valuation Tribunal Service
 West Northamptonshire Development Corporation

The Department for Culture, Media and Sport
 Advisory Committee on Historic Wreck Sites
 Advisory Committee on National Historic Ships
 Advisory Committee on the Government Art Collection
 Football Licensing Authority
 Horserace Totalisator Board
 Museums, Libraries and Archives Council
 Public Lending Right
 The Theaters Trust
 UK Film Council

The Department for Environment, Food and Rural Affairs  
 Advisory Committee on Hazardous Substances
 Advisory Committee on Packaging
 Advisory Committee on Pesticides
 Air Quality Expert Group
 British Waterways 
 Commission for Rural Communities
 Darwin Advisory Committee
 Farm Animal Welfare Council
 National Standing Committee on Farm Animal Genetic Resources
 Pesticide Residues Committee
 Spongiform Encephalopathy Advisory Committee
 Veterinary Residues Committee
 Zoos Forum

Department for Education  
 British Educational Communications and Technology Agency
 General Teaching Council for England
 Qualifications and Curriculum Development Agency
 School Food Trust

The Department of Health 
 Advisory Board on the Registration of Homeopathic Products
 Advisory Committee on Antimicrobial Resistance and Healthcare Associated Infections
 Advisory Committee on Borderline Substances
 Advisory Committee on Dangerous Pathogens
 Advisory Committee on the Safety of Blood, Tissues and Organs
 Advisory Group on Hepatitis
 Alcohol Education and Research Council 
 Appointments Commission
 Committee on Carcogenicity of Chemicals in Food, Consumer Products and the Environment
 Committee on Medical Effects of Air Pollutants
 Committee on Medical Aspects of Radiation in the Environment
 Committee on Mutagenicity of Chemicals in Food, Consumer Products and the Environment
 Committee on the Safety of Devices
 Council for Healthcare Regulatory Excellence
 Expert Advisory Group on AIDS
 Gene Therapy Advisory Committee
 General Social Care Council 
 Genetics and Insurance Committee
 Health Protection Agency
 Herbal Medicines Advisory Committee
 Human Fertilisation and Embryology Authority 
 Human Genetics Commission
 Human Tissue Authority
 Independent Advisory Group on Sexual Health and HIV
 Independent Review Panel for the Classification of Borderline Products
 Independent Review panel on the Advertising of Medicines
 Joint Committee on Vaccination and Immunisation
 National Information Governance Board for Health and Social Care
 National Joint Registry Steering Committee
 Scientific Advisory Committee on Nutrition

The Ministry of Justice
 Chief Coroner of England and Wales / Chief Coroner's Office 
 Crown Court Rule Committee
 H.M. Inspectorate of Court Administration  
 Legal Services Commission 
 Magistrates' Courts Rule Committee 
 Security Industry Authority 
 Women's National Commission

The Department for Transport 
 BRB (Residuary) Limited
 Cycling England
 Renewable Fuels Agency

The Department for Work and Pensions
 Child Maintenance and Enforcement Commission
 Disability Employment Advisory Committee
 Disability Living Allowance / Attendance Allowance Advisory Board

Quangos to be merged
The Department for Business, Innovation and Skills
 Ofcom
 Central Arbitration Committee
 Certification Office
 Competition Commission
 Office of Fair Trading
 Postal Services Commission

The Department for Culture, Media and Sport
 Gambling Commission
 National Lottery Commission
 UK Sport
 Sport England

The Ministry of Justice
 Advisory Committee on Justices of the Peace 
 Advisory Council on Historical Manuscripts
 Advisory Council on Public Records
 Crown Prosecution Service
 Revenue and Customs Prosecutions Office
 Serious Organised Crime Agency

The Department for Work and Pensions
 Pensions Ombudsman
 Pensions Protection Fund Ombudsman

Quangos to be reviewed
The Department for Business, Innovation and Skills
 Engineering Construction Industry Training Board
 Film Industry Training Board
 Insolvency Practitioners Tribunal
 Local Better Regulation Office - dissolved on 1 April 2012, its functions taken over by the Better Regulation Delivery Office, an independent unit within the BIS.
 Office for Fair Access
 Student Loans Company
 UK Atomic Energy Authority
 UK Commission for Employment and Skills

The Cabinet Office
 Central Office of Information
 National School of Government
 The Leasehold Advisory Service

The Department for Culture, Media and Sport
 Commission for Architecture and the Built Environment

The Department for Environment, Food and Rural Affairs 
 Agriculture and Horticulture Development Board
 Agricultural Land Tribunal
 Consumer Council for Water
 Plant Varieties and Seeds Tribunal
 Sea Fish Licence Tribunal
 Sustainable Development Commission

The Department of Education
 Children and Family Court Advisory and Support Service
 Children's Workforce Development Council
 National College for Leadership of Schools and Children's Services
 Partnerships for Schools
 School Support Staff Negotiating Body 
 The Office of the Children's Commissioner
 Training and Development Agency for Schools
 Young People's Learning Agency Under consideration

The Foreign and Commonwealth Office
 Diplomatic Service Appeals Board
 Foreign Compensation Commission
 Great Britain China Centre
 UK India Round Table

The Ministry of Justice
 Advisory Panel on Public Sector Information
 Judicial Appointments Commission
 Judicial Appointments and Conduct Ombudsman

The Home Office
 Independent Safeguarding Authority
 Office of the Immigration Services Commissioner
 Police Advisory Board, Police Negotiating Board and Police Arbitration Tribunal

References

Quango reforms
Public bodies and task forces of the United Kingdom government
Quango reforms
Reform in the United Kingdom